Air flow balls are small, plastic balls, often used in physical training because of their many gaping holes, which help reduce backspin and increase friction, thus hampering the ability to travel long distances. Also, the light plastic shell cuts down on damage to other objects when the ball hits them, making them good for recreation in urban and suburban areas.

Because they have very thin plastic shells, they break easily. Also, their low mass lets them be carried by the wind, making them potentially irretrievable.

Other uses
Air flow balls can also be used in golf practice, when they are roughly the size of a golf ball, but the harder they are hit, the more drag is created, so they are safe for golf training at home.

Exercise equipment
Physiological instruments